Nashua-Plainfield Junior-Senior High School, or Nashua-Plainfield Middle/Sr. High School, is rural public middle and high school in Nashua, Iowa, U.S. It is a part of the Nashua-Plainfield Community School District which serves Nashua and Plainfield.

The school's mascot is a Husky. His official name is "Sporty McHowler". Enrollment is around 300 students.

Athletics
The Huskies participate in the Top of Iowa Conference in the following sports:
Football
 2-time 8-man State Champions (2000, 2001)
Cross Country
Volleyball
Basketball
Bowling
Wrestling
 2-time Class 1A State Champions (2004, 2012)
Golf
Track and Field
Baseball
Softball

See also
List of high schools in Iowa

Notable alumni  
 Derek Pagel, former NFL player

References

External links
Nashua-Plainfield Middle School/High School

Public middle schools in Iowa
Public high schools in Iowa
Schools in Chickasaw County, Iowa